The Aeronca C-3 was a light plane built by the Aeronautical Corporation of America in the United States during the 1930s.

Design and development
Its design was derived from the Aeronca C-2. Introduced in 1931, it featured room for a passenger seated next to the pilot. Powered by a new  Aeronca E-113 engine, the seating configuration made flight training much easier and many Aeronca owners often took to the skies with only five hours of instruction—largely because of the C-3's predictable flying characteristics. Both the C-2 and C-3 are often described as “powered gliders” because of their gliding ability and gentle landing speeds.

The C-3's distinctive razorback design was drastically altered in 1935 with the appearance of the “roundback” C-3 Master. Retaining the tubular fuselage frame construction, the C-3 Master featured a smaller vertical stabilizer and rudder with a “filled out” fuselage shape that created the new “roundback” appearance and improved the airflow over the tail. With an enclosed cabin (brakes and wing light still cost extra), the 1935 C-3 Master was priced at only $1,895—just a few hundred dollars more than the primitive C-2 of 1930. The low price generated significant sales; 128 C-3 Masters were built in 1935 alone (of 430 C-3s built in all), and the 500th Aeronca aircraft also rolled off the assembly line that same year.

A version of the C-3 with fabric-covered ailerons (instead of metal), designated the Aeronca 100, was built in England under license by Light Aircraft Ltd. (operating as Aeronautical Corporation of Great Britain Ltd.) but the expected sales never materialized—only 24 British-built aircraft were manufactured before production was halted.

Production of the C-3 was halted in 1937 when the aircraft no longer met new U.S. government standards for airworthiness. Many of the C-3's peculiarities—a strictly external wire-braced wing with no wing struts directly connecting the wing panels with the fuselage, extensive fabric construction, single-ignition engine, and lack of an airspeed indicator—were no longer permitted. Fortunately for the legion of Aeronca owners, a “grandfather” clause in the federal regulations allowed their airplanes to continue flying, although they could no longer be manufactured.

Variants
C-3
Production variant.
C-3 Master
Improved variant.
Aeronca 100
British-built variant powered by an Aeronca JAP J-99 (a licence built Aeronca E-113C), 21 built.
Aeronca 300
Improved British variant of the Aeronca 100, one built.
Ely 700
British variant with wider fuselage and two doors, two built.

Surviving aircraft
 A-125 – C-3 on display at the Western North Carolina Air Museum in Hendersonville, North Carolina.
 A-189 – C-3 airworthy at the Western Antique Aeroplane & Automobile Museum in Hood River, Oregon. It is a floatplane and was built in 1931.
 A-194 – C-3 in storage at the Reynolds-Alberta Museum in Wetaskiwin, Alberta. It was built in 1931.
 A-215 – C-3 airworthy at the Western Antique Aeroplane & Automobile Museum in Hood River, Oregon. It was built in 1932.
 A-246 – PC-3 airworthy at the Eagles Mere Air Museum in Eagles Mere, Pennsylvania.
 A-258 – C-3 on static display at the San Diego Air & Space Museum in San Diego, California.
 A-288 – C-3 under restoration at the Wright Experience in Warrenton, Virginia.
 A-600 – C-3 airworthy with Paul A. Gliddon in Goathland, North Yorkshire.
 A-603 – C-3 airworthy with John Illsley. It was flown to South Africa from England in 1936.
 A-610 – C-3 airworthy with Nicholas Chittenden in  Lostwithiel, Cornwall. This aircraft featured in the 1986 BBC TV film "Flying For Fun", an adaptation of the eponymous 1936 book by Major HJ Parham.
 A-614 – C-3 on display at the Yanks Air Museum in Chino, California. 
 A-668 – C-3 airworthy at the EAA AirVenture Museum in Oshkosh, Wisconsin.
 A-673 – C-3B airworthy at the Port Townsend Aero Museum in Port Townsend, Washington. It was built in 1936.
 A-695 – C-3 on static display in the terminal building at Lunken Airport in Cincinnati, Ohio.
 A-717 – C-3 airworthy at the Golden Age Air Museum in Bethel, Pennsylvania. It is marked as NC17404.
 A-730 – C-3 airworthy at the Frasca Air Museum in Urbana, Illinois.
 A-754 – C-3 airworthy at Cole Palen's Old Rhinebeck Aerodrome in Red Hook, New York. It is registered as N17447.
 AB105 – Aeronca 100 airworthy with the Wingnut Syndicate in Warkworth, Auckland.
 526 – C-3 in storage at the Shannon Air Museum in Fredericksburg, Virginia.
 623 – C-3 airworthy at the Golden Wings Flying Museum in Blaine, Minnesota.
 Unknown ID – C-3 under restoration at the Aeronca Museum in Brighton, Michigan.
 Unknown ID – C-3 on display at the Wings of History Museum in San Martin, California.
 Unknown ID – C-3 under restoration at Generations in Aviation in Jacksonville, Florida. Built in 1932. registered NC12496
 Unknown ID – C-3 on static display at the Florida Air Museum in Lakeland, Florida.

Specifications (C-3)

See also

References

Notes

References

High-wing aircraft
Single-engined tractor aircraft
1930s United States civil utility aircraft
C-3